Anatolijus Baranovas (born 2 February 1940) is a Soviet long-distance runner. He competed in the marathon at the 1972 Summer Olympics.

References

External links
 

1940 births
Living people
Soviet male long-distance runners
Soviet male marathon runners
Olympic athletes of the Soviet Union
Athletes (track and field) at the 1972 Summer Olympics
People from Novgorod Oblast